Palestine competed at the 2017 Asian Indoor and Martial Arts Games held in Ashgabat, Turkmenistan from September 17 to 27. Palestine sent a delegation of 19 competitors for the event competing in 6 different sports.

The Palestinian team didn't receive any medal at the Games.

Participants

References 

Nations at the 2017 Asian Indoor and Martial Arts Games
Asian